Samuel Tyszkiewicz (1889–1954) was a Polish typographer, and a member of the once powerful Tyszkiewicz noble family.

References
 Jan Władysław Woś, Il tipografo Samuel F. Tyszkiewicz (1889-1954), Trento, Edizioni Civis, 1990.
 Grzegorz Sowula, Samuel Tyszkiewicz (Bibliotheca Typographica), 1991, .
 Marek Szypulski, Samuel Tyszkiewicz (1889–1954) - typograf emigracyjny, 2001, unpublished PhD dissertation )
 Jan Władysław Woś, Kilka uwag o Samuelu F. Tyszkiewiczu, jego Oficynie wydawniczej, przynależności wyznaniowej i pochodzeniu, Trento, Editrice Università degli studi di Trento, Facoltà di Lettere e Filosofia, Centro di Documentazione sulla Storia dell'Europa Orientale, 2006.
 Jan Władysław Woś, Gdy wydawca jest artystą... Samuel Fryderyk Tyszkiewicz (1889-1954) i jego oficyna wydawnicza, Akcent, rok 27 (2006), nr 2 (104), str. 100–108.

1889 births
1954 deaths
Samuel